The Europe Zone was one of the three regional zones of the 1984 Davis Cup.

25 teams entered the Europe Zone in total, split across two sub-zones. The winner of each sub-zone was promoted to the following year's World Group.

The Soviet Union defeated Israel in the Zone A final, and Spain defeated Hungary in the Zone B final, resulting in both the Soviet Union and Spain being promoted to the 1985 World Group.

Participating nations
Zone A: 

Zone B:

Zone A

Draw

First round

Monaco vs. Zimbabwe

Norway vs. Portugal

Poland vs. Greece

Senegal vs. Tunisia

Quarterfinals

Soviet Union vs. Monaco

Austria vs. Norway

Israel vs. Poland

Switzerland vs. Senegal

Semifinals

Soviet Union vs. Austria

Israel vs. Switzerland

Final

Soviet Union vs. Israel

Zone B

Draw

First round

Egypt vs. Luxembourg

Turkey vs. Belgium

Spain vs. Algeria

Morocco vs. Finland

Quarterfinals

Hungary vs. Egypt

Bulgaria vs. Belgium

Netherlands vs. Spain

Finland vs. Ireland

Semifinals

Belgium vs. Hungary

Spain vs. Ireland

Final

Hungary vs. Spain

References

External links
Davis Cup official website

Davis Cup Europe/Africa Zone
Europe Zone